Austria's Next Topmodel – Boys & Girls (stylized as Austria's Next Topmodel boysןɹıƃ), the sixth season of Austria's Next Topmodel, aired from September to December 2014. Model Melanie Scheriau returned to present the series for a second season, while panelists Carmen Kreuzer and Rolf Scheider were replaced by male models Papis Loveday and Michael Urban. Two major changes were made to the series' format for the season: as on America's Next Top Model, the series featured both female and male contestants, and a public voting system was implemented. Bianca Schwarzjirg equaled the role of Bryanboy on America's Next Top Model, retrieving and delivering the results of the public vote. Also a mentor to the contestants was season 1 winner Larissa Marolt.

Parts of the season were filmed in Nicosia, Milan, London and Berlin. The winner of the competition was 19-year-old Oliver Stummvoll from Böheimkirchen. As his prizes, he received a contract with Vienna-based modeling agency Wiener Models, a cover of German GQ magazine, a position as the face of Prinzenzauber jewellery and a Ford Fiesta. Stummvoll was the first male winner of the Top Model franchise.

Format change
Much like its American counterpart, the social media scoring system was also implemented this season. In contrast to the American adaptation however, each voter is required to cast their votes via Facebook. Furthermore, there is no grading scale. Each Facebook account is allotted three votes, which can be spent on any combination of contestants. The contestant with the highest number of votes each round is granted immunity, while the contestant with the lowest amount is automatically nominated for elimination along with three other contestants chosen by the judges.

Contestants

Episodes

Episode 1
Original airdate: September 11, 2014

Granted immunity by the public: Anna-Maria Jurisic	
Nominated for elimination by the public: Sanela Velagic	
Nominated for elimination by the judges: Carina Kriechhammer, Stella Schaljo & Sylvia Mankowska	
Bottom four: Carina Kriechhammer, Sanela Velagic, Stella Challiot & Sylvia Mankowska	
Eliminated: Stella Challiot
Featured photographer: Stefan Armbruster

Episode 2
Original airdate: September 18, 2014

Granted immunity by the public: Carina Kriechhammer
Nominated for elimination by the public: Mario Novak 
Nominated for elimination by the judges: Anna-Maria Jurisic, Damir Jovanovic & Sylvia Mankowska	
Bottom four: Anna-Maria Jurisic, Damir Jovanovic, Mario Novak & Sylvia Mankowska
Eliminated: Anna-Maria Jurisic
Featured photographer: Kosmas Pavlos
Special guests: Larissa Marolt

Episode 3
Original airdate: September 25, 2014

Immune: Kajetan Gerharter, Manuel Stummvoll, Miro Slavov & Oliver Stummvoll	
Granted immunity by the public: Damir Jovanovic	
Nominated for elimination by the public:  Mario Novak	
Nominated for elimination by the judges:  Lydia Zoglmeier, René Neßler & Sylvia Mankowska
Bottom four: Lydia Zoglmeier, Mario Novak, René Neßler & Sylvia Mankowska
Eliminated: Sylvia Mankowska

Episode 4
Original airdate: October 2, 2014	

Granted immunity by the public: Damir Jovanovic	
Nominated for elimination by the public: Manuel Stummvoll  
Nominated for elimination by the judges: Manuela Kral, Michael Molterer & Miro Slavov  
Bottom four:  Manuel Stummvoll, Manuela Kral, Michael Molterer & Miro Slavov	
Eliminated: Michael Molterer

Episode 5
Original airdate: October 9, 2014	

Granted immunity by the public: Damir Jovanovic	
Nominated for elimination by the public: Manuel Stummvoll  
Nominated for elimination by the judges: Michelle Hübner	& René Neßler
Bottom three:  Manuel Stummvoll, Michelle Hübner	& René Neßler
Eliminated: Manuel Stummvoll

Episode 6
Original airdate: October 16, 2014

Granted immunity by the public: Damir Jovanovic	
Nominated for elimination by the public: Mario Novak
Nominated for elimination by the judges: Carina Kriechhammer, Michelle Hübner & Sonja Plöchl	
Bottom four:  Carina Kriechhammer, Mario Novak, Michelle Hübner & Sonja Plöchl	
Eliminated: None

Episode 7
Original airdate: October 23, 2014

Eliminated outside of judging panel: Mario Novak
Granted immunity by the public: Carina Kriechhammer	
Nominated for elimination by the public: Miro Slavov	 
Nominated for elimination by the judges: Michelle Hübner, René Neßler & Sonja Plöchl	
Bottom four: Michelle Hübner, Miro Slavov, René Neßler & Sonja Plöchl
Eliminated: Michelle Hübner & René Neßler

Episode 8
Original airdate: October 30, 2014

Granted immunity by the public:  Oliver Stummvoll
Nominated for elimination by the public:  Miro Slavov  
Nominated for elimination by the judges: Carina Kriechhammer, Lydia Zoglmeier & Sanela Velagic		
Bottom four: Carina Kriechhammer, Lydia Zoglmeier, Miro Slavov & Sanela Velagic	
Eliminated: Carina Kriechhammer & Miro Slavov
Returned: Manuel Stummvoll

Episode 9
Original airdate: November 6, 2014

Granted immunity by the public: Oliver Stummvoll
Nominated for elimination by the judges: Kajetan Gerharter, Lydia Zoglmeier & Manuela Kral	
Nominated for elimination by the public: Sonja Plöchl
Quit: Sonja Plöchl
Bottom three: Kajetan Gerharter, Lydia Zoglmeier & Manuela Kral	
Eliminated: None

Episode 10
Original airdate: November 13, 2014

Granted immunity by the public: Oliver Stummvoll
Nominated for elimination by the public: Sanela Velagic
Nominated for elimination by the judges: Christoph Tauber Romieri, Damir Jovanovic & Kajetan Gerharter
Bottom four: Christoph Tauber Romieri, Damir Jovanovic, Kajetan Gerharter & Sanela Velagic
Eliminated: None

Episode 11
Original airdate: November 20, 2014

Eliminated outside of judging panel: Kajetan Gerharter
Granted immunity by the public: Oliver Stummvoll
Nominated for elimination by the public: Manuela Kral
Nominated for elimination by the judges: Christoph Tauber Romieri & Manuel Stummvoll	
Bottom three: Christoph Tauber Romieri, Manuel Stummvoll	& Manuela Kral
Eliminated:  Christoph Tauber Romieri

Episode 12
Original airdate: November 27, 2014

Granted immunity by the public: Oliver Stummvoll
First eliminated: Sanela Velagic	
Second eliminated: Damir Jovanovic	
Bottom two: Lydia Zoglmeier & Manuela Kral	
Eliminated: Lydia Zoglmeier

Episode 13
Original airdate: December 4, 2014

Returned: Sanela Velagic
Final four: Manuel Stummvoll, Manuela Kral, Oliver Stummvoll & Sanela Velagic
First eliminated: Manuel Stummvoll
Final three: Manuela Kral, Oliver Stummvoll & Sanela Velagic
Second eliminated: Manuela Kral
Final two: Oliver Stummvoll & Sanela Velagic
Austria's Next Top Model: Oliver Stummvoll

Summaries
 
 
 The contestant was eliminated outside of judging panel
 The contestant quit the competition
 The contestant was immune from elimination
 The contestant was in danger of elimination
 The contestant was eliminated
 The contestant won the competition

Photo shoot guide
Episode 1 photo shoot: Fight of the sexes
Episode 2 photo shoot: B&W sedcards; swimwear in Cyprus
Episode 3 photo shoot: Jumping into a pool with inflatables
Episode 4 photo shoot: Hanging from a ferris wheel
Episode 5 photo shoot: S&M bats hanging upside down
Episode 6 photo shoot: Waltzing in pairs
Episode 7 photo shoot: Jumping samurais
Episode 8 photo shoot: Horror in a graveyard
Episode 9 photo shoot: 3D characters with reptiles and insects
Episode 10 photo shoot: Sweet decadence
Episode 11 photo shoot: Nude in pairs as Adam and Eve
Episode 12 photo shoot: GQ magazine covers

Judges
Melanie Scheriau (host)
Papis Loveday
Michael Urban

References

External links
 Official website

Austria's Next Topmodel
2010s Austrian television series
2014 Austrian television seasons
German-language television shows
Television shows filmed in Austria
Television shows filmed in Cyprus
Television shows filmed in Italy
Television shows filmed in Switzerland
Television shows filmed in Germany
Television shows filmed in Hong Kong